Ídolos Brazil 1 (known as Ídolos 2006) was the first season of Brazilian reality interactive talent show Ídolos (and first aired on SBT), which premiered April 5, 2006 with the season finale airing on July 27, 2006.

Beto Marden and Lígia Mendes were the hosts and the judging panel consisted of Carlos Eduardo Miranda, Arnaldo Saccomani, Cyz Zamorano and Thomas Roth.

Leandro Lopes won the competition with Lucas Poletto as the first runner-up and Osnir Alves finishing third.

Early Process

Regional Auditions 
Auditions were held in the following cities:

Theater Round

Chorus Line 
The first day of Theater Week featured the one hundred fifteen contestants from the auditions round. Divided into groups, each contestant should go on stage and sing a song a capella for the judges until they stopped them. Seventy-five contestants advanced.

Groups 
The seventy-five remaining contestants were divided in groups of four or three. They had to pick a song and sing. The contestants were divided into three rooms. All the contestants in room 2 were eliminated, while contestants in rooms 1 and 3 advanced.

Solos 
Forty-five made it to the final round, which required the contestants singing solo. In the end, the judges take the contestants in groups of five and tell them if they made the final thirty.

Semi-finals 
The thirty semifinalists were randomly split into different groups. Each contestant would then sing in their respective group's night. There were three separate groups and the top three contestants from each group made it to the finals.

Wild Card 

Eight contestants who failed to make it to the finals were invited back to perform for another chance at a spot in the finals. Only one wildcard contestant (Davison Batista) was chosen by the public vote.

Finals

Finalists

Elimination chart

References

External links 
 Ídolos Brazil website

Ídolos (Brazilian TV series)
2006 Brazilian television seasons